is a railway station in the city of Yamagata, Yamagata Prefecture, Japan, operated by East Japan Railway Company (JR East).

Lines
Urushiyama Station is served by the Ōu Main Line, and is located 94.9 rail kilometers from the terminus of the line at Fukushima Station.

Station layout
The station has two opposed side platforms connected by a footbridge. Track one is adjacent to the station building; track 2 is on a passing loop. The station is unattended.

Platforms

History
Urushiyama Station opened on November 1, 1902. The station was absorbed into the JR East network upon the privatization of JNR on April 1, 1987. A new station building was completed in March 2009.

Surrounding area
Since December 1946 the Topcon factory has been next to the station.

See also
List of railway stations in Japan

References

External links

 JR East Station information 

Stations of East Japan Railway Company
Railway stations in Yamagata Prefecture
Ōu Main Line
Railway stations in Japan opened in 1902
Yamagata, Yamagata